This is a list of comics by Dimitris Papaioannou.

1980s
 Centaur (Unpublished), 1981
 Dear Rena (Babel 19: 58), 1982
 Lena (Babel 19: 59), 1982
 Eurymachus (Babel 32: 53–57), 1982
 Thighs etc. (Babel 33: 68), 1983
 Hair Loss and a Little Imagination (Babel 33: 69), 1983
 Who's Talking? (Para Pende 19: 51–65), 1986
 Rock 'n' Roll (Para Pende 20: 74–79), 1986
 Winter Stories (Para Pende 21: 94–97), 1986
 Marina (Kontrosol sto Haos 1: 7–10), 1986
 The Flies That Remember (Para Pende 22: 92–100), 1986
 Motherhood (Unpublished) 1987
 x=a+b+c+d+e+f (Para Pende 23: 68–80), 1987
 The Amazing Mever (Para Pende 25: 78–87), 1987
 Winter Stories – HO (Para Pende 26: 62–65), 1987
 Winter Stories – The Number 2 (Para Pende 27: 30–31), 1987
 Minotaur (Greek Playboy 28: 118–119) 1987
 The Red Freckles on Your Skin (Para Pende 28: 116–121), 1987
 Anaphe (Kontrosol sto Haos 2: 41–52), 1987
 Winter Stories – The Plane and the Train (Para Pende 29: 86–91), 1987
 The Beast on Stage (Para Pende 31: 56–58), 1987
 London Song (Para Pende 33: 76–81), 1988
 Kalymnos (Para Pende 34), 1988
 Girl in the Middle (Greek Playboy 39: 142–143) 1988
 My Ex-Boyfriend (Para Pende 37: 91–92), 1988
 Soundtrack (Nina Simone) (Babel 91: 22–25), 1988
 Fire (Babel 92: 70–79), 1988
 Doors (Babel 96: 72–75), 1989
 Nightmare (Babel 97: 84–87), 1989

1990s
 Face to Face (Babel 105: 48–53), 1990
 Gravity ("Experiment" Pull-out, Men magazine, spring issue: 2–16), 1990
 Jesus and Bacchus (Tsarouchis) ("Experiment" Pull-out, Men magazine, spring issue: 16), 1990
 American Nights (Max magazine, September issue: 96–97), 1990
 Un Bon Plan (Babel 114: 53), 1990
 The Ancient City (Babel 116: 44–45), 1990
 The German Guy (Kontrosol sto Haos 5: 27–38), 1992
 People's Myths (Tsarouchis) (Prosopa 2), 1992
 People's Myths (Tzeni Vanou) (Prosopa 3), 1992
 Footsteps (Eteria Katastasseon 1: 52–57), 1993
 With Some Images I Gathered (Società di Pensieri Year II, 4: 15–18), 1993
 Heart-Shaped Earth (Babel 145: 42–53), 1993
 Α Cigarette (Babel 150: 39), 1993
 Kiss and Bite (Babel 158: 43–52), 1994
 Ancient City (Zappion) (Klik magazine, February issue: 79), 1997

2000s
 Lust Night With You (Unpublished), 2002
 Athens, I See You (Athens Voice 11: 15), 2003
 Nowhere (LifO 171: 40–45), 2009

See also
List of Dimitris Papaioannou works

Lists of comics by creator